Skulinskaya is a rural locality (a village) in Verkhovskoye Rural Settlement, Verkhovazhsky District, Vologda Oblast, Russia. The population was 2 as of 2002.

Geography 
Skulinskaya is located 30 km southwest of Verkhovazhye (the district's administrative centre) by road. Moiseyevskaya is the nearest rural locality.

References 

Rural localities in Verkhovazhsky District